A Bruksnummer or Property unit number is the number for a bruk which is part of a geographical unit in the Norwegian land registry and serves as part of the Assessor's parcel number. The abbreviation is Bnr.

Each municipality is divided into a certain number of Gårdsnummers. Each Gårdsnummer is further divided into Bruksnummers. When a new property is established, it is assigned a new Bruksnnummer under the same Gårdsnummer. A common way of writing a real estate designation is for example. 17/235, where 17 is the Gårdsnummer and 235 is the bruksnummer. Another way of writing is Gnr 17, Bnr 235.

A bruksnummer can also be assigned a Festenummer and Seksjonsnummer number which can also be traded and pledged.

Land Register Hierarchy
 - Fylkesnummer 
 - Kommunenummer 
Gnr. – Gårdsnummer
Bnr. – Bruksnummer
Fnr. – Festenummer
Snr. – Seksjonsnummer

External links
Norwegian Farm Names
Oluf Rygh: Norwegian Farm Names
Gårdsmatrikkelen for 1886
Matrikkelutkastet av 1950

Nordic law
Scandinavian law
Law of Norway
Legal history of Norway